Neopentylene fluorophosphate, also known as NPF, is an organophosphate compound that is classified as a nerve agent. It has a comparatively low potency, but is stable and persistent, with a delayed onset of action and long duration of effects.

See also
 Diisopropyl fluorophosphate
 IPTBO

References

Organophosphate insecticides
Acetylcholinesterase inhibitors
Phosphorofluoridates
Dioxaphosphorinanes